Pisissarfik (old spelling Pisigsarfik) is a  mountain in the Sermersooq municipality, West Greenland. The mountain plays a major role in the Inuit mythology of Pisissarfik. It is also important as an archaeological site.

Geography 
The mountain is near the settlement of Kapisillit on the North bank of the Kapisillit Kangerluaq, a branch of the Nuup Kangerlua, about 150 km northeast of the Greenlandic capital Nuuk.

The inland side of the mountain is relatively smooth, but it forms a steep cliff by the coast. Pisissarfik is one of the most striking mountains of the region owing to its distinctive shape.

History 
Until about AD 1350 farmsteads forming part of the Western Settlement (Vestribyggð) were situated along the Kapisillit-Fjord. At that time there were often conflicts with the local Inuit; it is believed that this fighting (along with changes in climate) was one of the reasons for the disappearance of Scandinavian settlers from the region, and eventually from the whole of Greenland. The Kalaallisut name 'Pisissarfik' means 'shooting range' and derives from a legend of that time.

Legends 
An Inuk and a Viking are said to have climbed to the summit and held a shooting competition with bow and arrow on a seal pelt, stretched on a bank of the fjord. The Inuk won and pushed the loser off the cliff to his death, per the terms of the Viking's agreement.

According to Inuit mythology, the final and decisive battle between the Nordic settlers and themselves took place at the foot of the mountain, and resulted in the extinction of the settlers. The people long considered numerous graves found at the bottom of the cliff to be those of people killed in this fight. However, scientists from the Danish National Museum, who examined the site between 1945 and 1952, found that they were in fact Inuit graves dating from the 16th to 17th century.

Archaeological Finds 
The graves contained human corpses that had been preserved by natural mummification, as with those in Qilakitsoq. In one grave, three children were found, all under one year old. In another lay two women and two children, swathed in Reindeer skins. Even the clothing—anoraks made from bird and seal pelts, and Kamit (singular Kamik, seal skin boots)—were well preserved.

Pisissarfik played an important role in the Christianisation of the region in the 18th century: on Pentecost Sunday 1749 the first Deutsche Messe was celebrated at its foot.

See also
List of mountains in Greenland

References

General references 

 – Bilder des Pisissarfik

History of Greenland
Inuit culture
Archaeological sites in Greenland
Mountains of Greenland